Joseph Allen Muir (November 26, 1922 – June 25, 1980) was an American Major League Baseball pitcher. The ,  left-hander played parts of two seasons in the majors, 1951 and 1952, for the Pittsburgh Pirates, allowing 53 hits and 25 bases on balls in 52 innings pitched in 21 games played. His professional baseball career lasted for seven seasons (1947–1953), spent in the Pirates' organization.

A native of Oriole, Maryland, on that state's Eastern Shore, Muir was inducted into The Eastern Shore Baseball Hall of Fame in 1982, two years after his death at age 57.

References

External links

1922 births
1980 deaths
Baseball players from Maryland
Hollywood Stars players
Indianapolis Indians players
Major League Baseball pitchers
People from Somerset County, Maryland
Pittsburgh Pirates players
Rehoboth Beach Pirates players
York White Roses players